Philippe Leroy (3 February 1940 – 19 August 2019) was a member of the Senate of France from 2001 until 2017, representing the Moselle department.  He was a member of the Union for a Popular Movement.

References

Page on the Senate website

1940 births
2019 deaths
Politicians from Lille
Union for a Popular Movement politicians
The Republicans (France) politicians
Gaullism, a way forward for France
French Senators of the Fifth Republic
Senators of Moselle (department)
Politicians from Grand Est
Chevaliers of the Légion d'honneur
Recipients of the Order of Merit of the Federal Republic of Germany